Lee Yong-hun is the name of:

 Lee Yong-hun (born 1942), South Korean judge
 Mathias Ri Iong-hoon (born 1951), South Korean Roman Catholic bishop
 Yong Hoon Lee (born 1955), South Korean academic
 Yonghoon Lee (born 1973), South Korean opera singer

See also 
 Lee Yeong-hun (disambiguation) (이영훈)